Daniel Andres Farquhar (born February 17, 1987) is an American former professional baseball pitcher. He played for the Toronto Blue Jays, Seattle Mariners, Tampa Bay Rays and Chicago White Sox before retiring on July 31, 2019.

Amateur career
Farquhar attended Archbishop Edward A. McCarthy High School in Southwest Ranches, Florida, where he played for the school's baseball team as a pitcher and outfielder. He batted .436 as a sophomore. As an outfielder, Farquhar was named to the All-District Second Team in 2004, his junior year. As a senior, he had a 0.89 earned run average (ERA), a school record.

Farquhar enrolled in college at the University of Louisiana at Lafayette, where he played for the Louisiana Ragin' Cajuns baseball team, competing in the Sun Belt Conference. As a college freshman, he had a 6–1 win–loss record with four saves and a 2.17 ERA. He led the Sun Belt Conference in ERA. In 2007, as a sophomore, Farquhar went 6–3 with six saves, a 3.08 ERA and 115 strikeouts to 22 walks in  innings pitched. He was fourth in the conference in ERA and second in strikeouts. After the 2007 season, he played collegiate summer baseball with the Harwich Mariners of the Cape Cod Baseball League. As a junior, he had a 3–8 record with a 4.95 ERA.

Professional career

Toronto Blue Jays
The Toronto Blue Jays selected Farquhar in the tenth round, with the 309th overall selection, of the 2008 MLB draft. He signed with Toronto and made his professional debut with the Auburn Doubledays of the Class A-Short Season New York–Penn League. He was promoted to the Lansing Lugnuts of the Class A Midwest League during the season. He finished 2008 with 2–2 win–loss record,  innings pitched (IP), and a 1.95 ERA. In 2009, he started the season with the Dunedin Blue Jays of the Class A-Advanced Florida State League and finished the season with the New Hampshire Fisher Cats of the Class AA Eastern League. In 2009, Farquhar had a 2–4 record, 1.87 ERA and 22 saves, in  innings pitched.

The Blue Jays traded Farquhar to the Oakland Athletics along with Trystan Magnuson for outfielder Rajai Davis after the 2010 season. He threw eight innings without allowing a run for the Sacramento River Cats of the Class AAA Pacific Coast League (PCL), before the Athletics traded him to the Blue Jays in exchange for reliever David Purcey on April 18. The Blue Jays assigned him to the Las Vegas 51s of the PCL.

Farquhar made his major league debut on September 13, 2011, against the Boston Red Sox. He pitched  innings and allowed three earned runs on three hits, while walking two with no strikeouts. Farquhar was later optioned back to New Hampshire. On June 2, 2012, the Blue Jays designated Farquhar for assignment after claiming Chris Schwinden off waivers from the New York Mets.

Oakland Athletics
On June 9, 2012, the Athletics claimed Farquhar off waivers from the Blue Jays. After making five appearances in the minor leagues for Sacramento, the Athletics waived him to select the contract of A. J. Griffin.

New York Yankees
The New York Yankees claimed him off waivers on June 26 and optioned him to the Trenton Thunder, shifting Brett Gardner to the 60-day disabled list. However, he was placed on waivers three days later, as the Yankees claimed Schwinden, who had been waived by the Cleveland Indians. He cleared waivers.

Seattle Mariners
On July 23, 2012, the Yankees traded Farquhar and pitcher D. J. Mitchell to the Seattle Mariners for right fielder Ichiro Suzuki.

Farquhar started the 2013 season with the Tacoma Rainiers of the PCL. The Mariners purchased his contract, promoting him to the major leagues, on May 17. On August 2, Farquhar replaced Tom Wilhelmsen as closer, and he recorded his first major league save on August 3 against Baltimore. From that point to the end of the season, he went 0-3 with 16 saves in 24 games, striking out 29 in  innings with a 2.38 ERA. Overall on the year, he went 0–3 with a 4.20 ERA in 46 appearances, striking out 79 in  innings.

Tampa Bay Rays
On November 5, 2015, the Mariners traded Farquhar, Brad Miller, and Logan Morrison to the Tampa Bay Rays for Nate Karns, C. J. Riefenhauser, and Boog Powell.

On April 23, 2016, Farquhar was sent down to the Durham Bulls of the Class AAA International League. He was recalled on May 14, but was designated for assignment the next day, and was back with Durham on the 16th. On June 25, Farquhar was sent back up to the Rays, on the 26th, one day later, he was sent back down to Durham, on the 27th, he was called back up to the Rays. This time Farquhar made it 8 days before his July 5 demotion back to Durham. On August 6, Farquhar was called back up to the Rays, this was his final transaction of the season. He finished the season with a 3.06 ERA in 35 games ( innings) and 46 strikeouts.

Farquhar was designated for assignment on June 29, 2017. He cleared waivers and was assigned to Durham. The Rays released him on July 20.

Chicago White Sox
On July 24, 2017, Farquhar signed a minor league contract with the Chicago White Sox. His contract was purchased by the White Sox on August 19, 2017.  In a game on September 22, 2017 against the Houston Astros, Farquhar made a pitching appearance in the 8th inning against Astros hitter Evan Gattis.  During the at bat, Farquhar noticed banging from within the Astros dugout every time the catcher called for any pitch other than a fastball.  Eventually, Farquhar and catcher Kevan Smith made a mound visit because of it and afterwards Gattis was struck out after a pitch without a sign was called.   This incident would become part of the investigation of the Houston Astros sign stealing scandal.

2018 brain hemorrhage
On April 20, 2018, after pitching in relief in the sixth inning in a game against the Houston Astros, Farquhar collapsed in the dugout. Witnesses saw him go into the White Sox's dugout and vomit before losing consciousness. Farquhar was carried out by ambulance and taken to Rush University Medical Center. Teammates said they were shocked because they did not "notice any signs that Farquhar might have been sick". After further testing, doctors revealed Farquhar suffered from a brain hemorrhage, which was caused from a ruptured brain aneurysm. On May 7, 2018, Farquhar was discharged from the hospital. Despite being ruled out for the rest of the 2018 season, Demetrius Klee Lopes and other doctors expected him to make a full recovery and pitch again. On June 1, 2018, he had recovered enough to throw the ceremonial first pitch for the White Sox's game against the Milwaukee Brewers. Farquhar elected free agency following the 2018 season.

Return to the Yankees organization
On January 21, 2019, Farquhar signed a minor league contract with the Yankees. He was released on June 19, 2019. On August 1, on his personal Instagram account, he announced his retirement.

Coaching career
Farquhar was announced as pitching coach of the Winston-Salem Dash, the Class-A Advanced affiliate of the Chicago White Sox, for the 2020 season.

Personal life
Farquhar is married to his high school sweetheart, Alexandria Castells Farquhar, and they have one daughter and two sons. Off the field, Farquhar enjoys the game of golf. He has said that he would like to coach and teach math at the high school level one day.

References

External links

1987 births
Living people
American expatriate baseball players in Canada
Sportspeople from Pembroke Pines, Florida
Baseball players from Florida
Major League Baseball pitchers
Toronto Blue Jays players
Seattle Mariners players
Tampa Bay Rays players
Chicago White Sox players
Louisiana Ragin' Cajuns baseball players
Harwich Mariners players
Auburn Doubledays players
Lansing Lugnuts players
Dunedin Blue Jays players
New Hampshire Fisher Cats players
Peoria Javelinas players
Sacramento River Cats players
Las Vegas 51s players
Trenton Thunder players
Scranton/Wilkes-Barre Yankees players
Tacoma Rainiers players
Cardenales de Lara players
American expatriate baseball players in Venezuela
Durham Bulls players
Charlotte Knights players